Jennifer Cohen (born September 16, 1976) is a fitness personality, author and body image consultant living in Los Angeles, California, United States of America.

Career 
Cohen is originally from Winnipeg, Manitoba, Canada and has a degree in psychology from the University of Manitoba, a diploma in sports marketing from George Brown College in Toronto, and numerous fitness certifications. Cohen began her career as a personal trainer focusing on workouts that can be done with little or no equipment outside of a gym and continues this philosophy of integrating fitness into everyday life. Cohen's philosophy of an everyday approach and realistic expectations is the focus of her first book, No Gym Required: Unleash Your Inner Rockstar. Her articles and quotes have appeared in Redbook, People and Perez Hilton's fitness-centric website, FitPerez. Her latest book is Strong is the New Skinny (2014).

Weight Watchers 
Cohen began working with Weight Watchers in 2011. She became a spokesperson for the Weight Watchers Walk-It Challenge, a 5K walk in Los Angeles and various locations throughout the United States on May 22, 2011.

In February 2012, the Weight Watchers Points Plus Fitness Series were made available to weight watchers members. The 5-DVD set featured Cohen and her workouts.

Dr. Drew's Lifechangers 
Cohen is a reoccurring guest on Lifechangers, a daytime talk show hosted by board certified internist and relationship expert, Dr. Drew Pinsky. In August 2011 Cohen began blogging for the show about various body image issues.

Forbes 
Cohen has been an op-ed columnist on Forbes.com since March 2012. Her articles are focused on executives and entrepreneurs, and offer tips to boost productivity through improved health and wellness. Her articles are often at the top of the most viewed section of op-ed.

Men's Fitness 
Cohen is a contributing author to the Men's Fitness column "The Rack" since 2012. Some of her more popular articles include "3 Reasons Men Should Do Yoga", "5 Things Muscle Activation Technique (MAT) Training Can Do for Your Body"  and "Can Masturbation Help You Lose Weight?"

Momentum by Iron 
In 2013, Cohen launched and became the manager of Momentum by Iron, a workout studio in Santa Monica, California. Momentum by Iron was named one of "L.A.'s Four Hot New Sweat Dens" by The Hollywood Reporter.

Health.com 
Cohen writes on fitness topics, with lists of exercises to target specific body parts or goals, and new trends in the fitness industry. Her articles have been republished on the Huffington Post and on ABC News.com.

Entrepreneur 
Cohen writes wellness-related columns for Entrepreneur.com and has been able to garner a loyal readership. These articles mainly focus on stress, weight-loss, and success.

Habits And Hustle 
Her Habits And Hustle podcast has been syndicated by Entrepreneur Magazine and is listed in their podcast network. The show is regularly ranked on iTunes.

Notable guests that have appeared on the show include Gary Vaynerchuk, Dr. Mehmet Oz, Robert Greene, Dennis Rodman, Gabrielle Reece, Jerry West, Strauss Zelnick, Tom Bilyeu, Alli Webb, Erika Nardini, Valorie Kondos, and Katelyn Ohashi.

References

External links 
 
 Habits And Hustle official website
The Secret to Getting Anything You Want in Life: Jennifer Cohen

Canadian television personalities
Canadian women non-fiction writers
Living people
Writers from Los Angeles
Writers from Winnipeg
21st-century Canadian non-fiction writers
21st-century Canadian women writers
Canadian health and wellness writers
Canadian women television personalities
1976 births
George Brown College alumni
University of Manitoba alumni